Ben&Ben is a folk-pop band based in the Philippines. Formed in 2017, the band has since been known for their hit songs, "Kathang Isip," “Maybe The Night”, “Leaves”, “Paninindigan Kita”, “Araw-Araw”, and "Sa Susunod Na Habangbuhay" among others. They have been named Spotify's Most Streamed Artist in 2020 in the Philippines, and Most Streamed Filipino Artist from 2021 to 2022.

The nine-piece musical act has won several awards, including multiple Awit Awards, Myx Awards, Wish 107.5 Music Awards, and even an NME Award for Best Asian Band.

Band members

Current members
 Paolo Benjamin Guico – lead vocals, acoustic guitar
 Miguel Benjamin Guico – lead vocals, acoustic guitar
 Poch Barretto – lead guitar, backing vocals
 Jam Villanueva – drums
 Agnes Reoma – bass
 Andrew De Pano – percussion, backing vocals
 Toni Muñoz – percussion, lead and backing vocals
 Keifer Cabugao – violin, backing vocals
 Patricia Lasaten – keyboards

History
2016 - 2017: The First EP

Prior to the formation of the band, twins Paolo Benjamin and Miguel Benjamin were a duo called “The Benjamins.” Before the release of the first EP in 2016, the duo changed their name to Ben&Ben. The two brothers met all the current members of the band while playing shows around Metro Manila. They then invited each of them to play for their EP launch in December 2016. It was only on May 10, 2017 that the group officially became a nine-piece band.

2018: Soundtracks and Music Festivals

In 2018, the band rose to fame with their music being included in soundtracks for popular Filipino films. Their song “Susi” was heard in the film Goyo: Ang Batang Heneral and “Maybe The Night,” became the soundtrack of Exes Baggage. The band was also part of Coke Studio Homecoming Season 2.

The band participated in some of their first local-international music festivals in 2018. They were a part of Karpos Multimedia's Wanderland Music and Arts Festival and The Rest is Noise's All Of The Noise among many. This year also saw the beginning of the band performing for audiences beyond Metro Manila, all over their home country, the Philippines.

2019: First album: Limasawa Street

Debut album: Limasawa Street 

After gaining a few hit singles like “Kathang Isip”, “Leaves”, “Ride Home,” and “Maybe The Night,” the band announced that they’d be releasing an album by May 2019. Their debut album “Limasawa Street” is derived from the Butuanon word “masawa” meaning light. The album gamed multiple recognitions including Awit Award for Favorite Album of the Year.

In the same year, the band dabbled in a bit of acting. They acted as themselves in the 2019 music film LSS (Last Song Syndrome) alongside Gabbi Garcia and Khalil Ramos. 10 of the band's songs were featured in the film. The said film was part of the Pista ng Pelikulang Pilipino. Their song “Araw-Araw” won Best Original Song for the film festival.

2020: Concerts and Charity Events

Ben&Ben, together with Sony Music artists like Eric Chou, Benjamin Kheng, Jason Chan and Cath Wong, took part in a regional collaboration expressing solidarity and support by those affected by the COVID-19 pandemic. All proceeds of the song were donated to relief efforts by Han Hong Love Charity Foundation.

The band was set to perform in several international music festivals in 2020 including South by South West. All these engagements were officially canceled when the world closed down due to the COVID-19 pandemic, Early in the lockdown, the band held an online concert “Puhon!” (Bisaya: Hopefully) to raise funds for the COVID-19 relief efforts. The funds were also aimed at providing support for medical frontliners. Through their crowdfunding platform puhon.ph, Ben&Ben was able to bring people together to combat COVID-19 in the Philippines by providing a timely and coordinated response to affected communities. The band and their partners were able to donate more than Php 5 Million (USD 90,000) to COVID relief efforts.

In the same year, the band put up a second online charity concert. “Balik Eskwela: Puhon Part 2” was aimed at supporting students and teachers who are left with limited to no ability to adapt to the changes implemented in the Philippine education system.

The band released a music video for “War.” The song and the music video was dedicated to frontliners. Along with its release, the band encouraged fans to continue supporting the production of COVID-19 test kits and left a link where they could leave donations. The donation service is in partnership with the One Nation Against Covid-19 Project.

2020 - 2021: The Ben&Ben House, Liwanag (the official fandom), and their Sophomore Album

In April, following a peak at the 29th spot in Billboard's Top 50 Social chart, Ben&Ben announced on social media that it will be releasing their first international single "Doors".

Because of all the COVID-19 restrictions, in June 2020, the band made the radical decision to live together in one house. They would write and produce music, and hold video shoots for online events and concerts under one roof.

While living together, the band was able to participate in multiple online concerts like the Philippine segment of the YouTube Fanfest in September 2020 and private corporate events.

Formation of “Liwanag”, the official Ben&Ben Fandom

In September of 2020, Ben&Ben announced that they would be officially naming their fandom “Liwanag”, which is a Filipino word for “Light”. The announcement gained a positive response from the then-existing listener community of Ben&Ben, which they maintained a close relationship with on social media.

Second album: Pebble House, Vol. 1: Kuwaderno 
Ben&Ben released their sophomore album Pebble House, Vol. 1: Kuwaderno under Sony Music Philippines. Within three days after the release, all the tracks from the album were included on Spotify's Top 200 charts, seven of which were included in the Top 100 charts of the same music streaming platform. The 12-track album sees Ben&Ben at their most playful and creative. Six of the album's tracks feature other artists like Chito Miranda, KZ Tandingan, Munimuni, and SB19. The album's name “Pebble House” comes from the name of the street where they lived. Each of the band members was assigned to co-produce one song each. This approach gave each song in the album their own distinct musical flavor. Pebble House, Vol 1: Kuwaderno won an Awit Award for Album of the Year.

On December 5, 2021, the band held an online concert entitled “Kuwaderno: An Online Concert.” The band and the whole team behind the concert shot the whole concert at the Araneta Coliseum. Members of the creative team included concert director Paolo Valenciano alongside co-director Maribel Legarda, Philippine Theater Association (PETA), and lighting designer Shakira Villa-Symes.

2022: The Return of Live Shows, The Philippine Elections, and the North America Tour

Along with the steady lifting of COVID-19 restrictions, live gigs and concerts started coming back. In January, the band was slated to perform at Expo 2020 Dubai. A week before their supposed performance date, they announced that some of their members got  COVID-19 and had to postpone the performance to a later date. On March 10, they were able to perform in Dubai in front of an audience of 16,000. Expo 2020 Dubai was their first live show since 2020.

With the 2022 Philippine Elections coming closer, the band announced their support for the opposition presidential and vice presidential candidates, Leni Robredo and Kiko Pangilinan. They volunteered to perform for multiple campaign rallies of the opposition slate around the Philippines.

Prior to their incoming North America Tour, Ben&Ben announced that they’d be holding a Major Send-Off Concert on September 3 at the Cultural Center of the Philippines’ open grounds. On the day of the concert, the producer Ovation Productions decided to postpone the show due to inclement weather.

The band's first North America Tour included cities from both the United States and Canada. The said concert series was produced by Nosaj Entertainment. Due to US Visa complications, the band had to move some tour dates around. The band was able to bring their sound and electrifying energy to several states and cities around North America.

After the success of their first out of the country tour, Ben&Ben resumed touring regularly around the cities and provinces of the Philippines. The postponed send-off concert was renamed to “Ben&Ben Homecoming Concert 2022.” This was held on December 18 at the SMDC Festival Grounds. The concert saw an attendance of more than 60,000 people in the audience.

2023: International Music Festivals and New Music

In late 2022, Ben&Ben announced that they would be performing at their first international music festival outside the Philippines, the Clockenflap Music Festival in Hong Kong. They performed alongside artists such as Julia Wu, Bombay Bicycle Club, Ezra Collective, and Wu-Tang Clan on March 5, 2023. 

Furthermore, Ben&Ben shared via their social media channels that they are currently writing new material to be released later in the year.

Artistry 
Creative Process

The band has a creative process that is holistic and involves all members of the band. Miguel Benjamin and Paolo Benjamin are the primary songwriters, with each song being a collaboration on both music and lyrics.

The general creative vision, along with the lyrics, melodies and chords are then presented to the band. Each band member then builds on the final arrangement of the song, until it becomes its final version. The production, riffs, instrumentals, fills and atmospheric sounds are composed by each of the band members.

Musical Style 

The band's sound has been described as folk-pop. The band fuses instruments of alternative band music such as electric guitars, keyboards, bass guitars, and drums, with acoustic instruments such as percussions, violins, and acoustic guitars. Furthermore, the band combines folk textures with pop songwriting sensibilities.

In Pebble House: Vol. 1 Kuwarderno, their second album, the band explored arranging their music in a diverse array of genres, such as rock, world, funk and alternative. 

Lyrical Themes

The lyrical themes of the band emphasize the cathartic nature of life. With themes about faith, hope, forgiveness, heartbreak, and love, the band aims to bring out a feeling of catharsis and resolution with every song. These are reflected in the band's work, such as “Kathang Isip”, “Leaves”, “Maybe The Night”, and “Paninindigan Kita”. 

The band's approach to songwriting was even more in-depth and diverse with their second album, Pebble House: Vol. 1 Kuwarderno. The band tackled lyrical themes about social issues such as women empowerment, mental health, political abuse of power, and self-acceptance. as reflected in their  songs “Sabel”, “Lunod”, “Kapangyarihan”, and “Di Ka Sayang”. 

Influences

Ben&Ben cites Filipino folk artists such as Joey Ayala, Gary Granada, and Johnoy Danao as influences for their songwriting. Furthermore, the band's music is also influenced by Filipino bands  and artists such as Up Dharma Down, Ebe Dancel, and Urbandub.

Currently, the band is inspired by bands such as Coldplay, Paramore, The Beatles, Snarky Puppy, and Vulfpeck. Ben&Ben also looks up to the work of their contemporaries in the Filipino Music Scene, such as Zild, One Click Straight, SB19, Ena Mori, among others.

Current songwriting influences for the band, particularly Paolo Benjamin and Miguel Benjamin include Carole King, Adele, H.E.R., Steve Lacy, Beabadobee, Noah Kahan, and Madison Cunningham, among others.

Discography

 Limasawa Street (2019)
 Pebble House, Vol. 1: Kuwaderno (2021)

Filmography

Films

Other ventures

Endorsements

Concerts, tours, and performances

Tours

Live and virtual concerts and conventions

Music festivals

Awards and nominations

References

External links

 
Filipino rock music groups
Filipino pop music groups
Musical groups from Metro Manila
Sony Music Philippines artists
Folk-pop music groups